The women's 5000 metres at the 2008 Summer Olympics took place on 19–22 August at the Beijing National Stadium.

The qualifying standards were 15:09.00 (A standard) and 15:24.00 (B standard).

While the race was strategically different, the results were much the same as the 10,000m final a week earlier. Elvan Abeylegesse took the lead early, but the field did not dissipate behind her. Instead, Ethiopians, Kenyans and newly-crowned steeplechase world record holder, Gulnara Samitova-Galkina, countered each attempt to pull away.  Going into the last lap, Abeylegesse of Turkey and three Ethiopians were at the front, with the Kenyan team and Russian Liliya Shobukhova trailing. Tirunesh Dibaba jumped into the lead with the expected chase coming from Meseret Defar, in one of the few head-to-head battles between these two stars. But Abeylegesse refused to get out of the picture. Through the final turn she caught Defar and swung wide into lane 2 as if to speed past Dibaba. She was able to match Dibaba's speed down the final straight but couldn't make up the ground she had lost, with Dibaba taking her second gold medal and Defar holding off the rest of the field to take bronze.

On 29 March 2017, IAAF confirmed that Abeylegesse had tested positive for a banned substance at the 2007 World Championships in Athletics, and that her results from 2007 to 2009, including her Olympic silvers, had been expunged.

Records
Prior to this competition, the existing world and Olympic records were as follows:

No new world or Olympic records were set for this event.

Results

Round 1

Qualification: First 6 in each heat(Q) and the next 3 fastest(q) advance to the final.

Final

Splits

References

Athletics at the 2008 Summer Olympics
5000 metres at the Olympics
2008 in women's athletics
Women's events at the 2008 Summer Olympics